Old North Church is a church built in 1824, in Marblehead, Massachusetts for the First Congregational Church. It is built in the Colonial Georgian style.

Their current designated term associate pastor is Rev. Lindsay Popperson.

References 

Congregational churches in Massachusetts
Churches completed in 1824